William Hugh Charles Watson was a Scottish author, playwright and newspaper editor. He was initially Literary and then Features editor of the Scotsman newspaper.

Born in Edinburgh on 30 April 1931, he attended Edinburgh Academy and then entered Edinburgh and Oxford universities but did not complete either course.

He commenced writing novels in 1969 with Better than One and then wrote two historical novels. The first, titled Beltran in Exile (1979) was about the Knights Templar after the end of the Crusades in Palestine.  The Knight on the Bridge (1982) is about the Cathars.  These two latter books are generally regarded as his best works.

Between 1970 and 1972 he wrote three plays; Footstool for God, set in Rosslyn Chapel, The Larch and Dodwell's Last Trump. He also co-wrote Sawney Bean with Robert Nye in 1970, and, with Nye, Stanley Eveling, Alan Jackson, Clarisse Eriksson, John Downing and David Mowat an adaptation of Dracula which premiered in Edinburgh in 1969, and in London in 1972.

He wrote six spy thrillers under the nom-de-plume of J K Mayo between 1986 and 1997 using a middle-aged, irritable, Gauloise-smoking  ex-army Colonel named Harry Seddall as his hero for these popular books.  An interesting aside is his apparent enjoyment of using little-known and obscure words to enhance his excellent descriptions of places and intelligent conversations throughout the books.

He died in an Edinburgh nursing home on 5 December 2005 after a long illness.

He left a wife named Catherine Robins.

Selected works

1 Published under the pseudonym of J.K. Mayo.

References

Scottish novelists
1930 births
2005 deaths
Scottish dramatists and playwrights
People educated at Edinburgh Academy
Alumni of the University of Edinburgh
20th-century Scottish novelists
Scottish male novelists
20th-century British dramatists and playwrights
20th-century British male writers